Vivek Khurana (born 2 June 1984) is an Indian former cricketer. He played one first-class match for Delhi in 2001/02.

See also
 List of Delhi cricketers

References

External links
 

1984 births
Living people
Indian cricketers
Delhi cricketers
Cricketers from Delhi